The eight Books of Remembrance housed in the Memorial Chamber in the Peace Tower of the Canadian Parliament Buildings in Ottawa are illuminated manuscript volumes recording the names of members of the Canadian Forces and Canadian Merchant Navy killed on active service in wartime, and in other conflicts. There are eight separate books, beginning with the first to be commissioned listing the names of the dead from the First World War.

The display case for the first book was designed by John A. Pearson, architect of the Peace Tower, and made by Bromsgrove Guild Limited (Great Britain) and Robert Mitchell Company in 1928. Made of bronze, enamel and other metals, it is decorated with four kneeling angels and a ribbon encircling a laurel. It rests on an altar of English Hoptonwood limestone that was a British gift to Canada, situated at the centre of the chamber. Later books are displayed on altars of Hoptonwood stone and bronze, decorated with poppies, located against the walls of the chamber.

The pages of each of the Books are turned every day of the year at 11 a.m. by a constable of the Parliamentary Protective Service, so that every name is on display to visitors at least once during each calendar year.

Conception of the books
During the First World War on July 1, 1917, Prime Minister Robert Borden announced a Memorial Chamber would be included in the soon-to-be constructed Peace Tower, part of the rebuild of the Centre Block of the Canadian parliament buildings after a 1916 fire. He said that it would be a "memorial to the debt of our forefathers and to the valour of those Canadians who, in the Great War, fought for the liberties of Canada, of the Empire, and of humanity".

Although it was originally hoped to inscribe the names of the dead Canadians upon the walls of the chamber, it was decided that it was more practical to follow Colonel A. Fortesque Duguid's idea to house Books of Remembrance inside the chamber instead.

On August 3, 1927, while in Ottawa, the Prince of Wales (later King Edward VIII) unveiled an altar, a gift from the British government, upon which the book of the First World War would rest. The stone for the steps came from quarries in Flanders Fields and the brass nameplates were cast from spent shell casings from the war.

Illumination
All the books have some illumination; those for the two world wars having the most, with each page having a wide border at the top decorated with plant motifs, usually leaves, and a unit badge.  Other books only have illumination on the title page.

The Books

First World War
The Book of the First World War is the largest of the books, containing 66,655 names.  It took James Purves of London, Ontario eleven years to gather the necessary materials to begin work on the book, and upon his death in 1940, work passed to his assistant Alan Beddoe, who completed the book by 1942.  (Beddoe would spend the next thirty years of his life as the chief artist of the books, dying in 1975.) Contributors to the first book included Evelyn Lambart, who would go on to become an animator at the National Film Board of Canada.

Second World War
In 1948, it was announced that a second book would be created to memorialize the 44,893 Canadians who had died in the Second World War. This time Beddoe was given a chief assistant, five assistant artists, two writers, an accounting officer and a proof-reader to help with the book, scheduled to be completed in 1952. A series of delays, however, slowed the progress of the book notably after the government decided that work should be restarted in 1951, to re-write all the names, this time including the abbreviations of individual regiments. The book was completed in 1957, and that Remembrance Day was placed in the Memorial Chamber alongside the first book.

In 1959, humidity destroyed the bindings of the two World War books, requiring them to be re-bound.

Newfoundland
The Newfoundland book, commemorating over 2300 Newfoundlanders who died in the First and Second World War (before Newfoundland became a province of Canada), was placed in the Memorial Chamber in 1973.

Korean War
516 Canadians died in the Korean War (1950–1953).

South African War and Nile Expedition
Canada's first overseas war, the Nile Expedition for the Relief of General Gordon (1884–1885) claimed 16 lives from a Canadian force of 400.  Of the 7,000 Canadian troops deployed in the South African War, about 250 died and are listed in the book.

Merchant Navy
From the Canadian Merchant Navy, more than 570 Canadian men and women died during the First World War and more than 1600 during the Second World War.  This book was dedicated in 1993.

7th book, "In the Service of Canada"
A seventh Book of Remembrance, dedicated on November 11, 2005, lists members of the Canadian Forces who died on active duty in the service of Canada (other than those already covered by the Korean War book) since the close of the Second World War book.  Unlike the others, which were designed after the end of each period of hostilities, the seventh book is ongoing and is expected to continue "for generations to come".
A second volume for the 7th Book of Remembrance in currently in production.

 the calligrapher for the 7th Book of Remembrance, Vol. I & II, was Ottawa resident Richard Draffin.

War of 1812
In 2019, an eighth book was unveiled from the War of 1812, listing more than 1,600 dead who served in Canadian fencible or militia units, or with the forces of First Nation Crown allies, during the War of 1812.

References

External links

Books of Remembrance at Library and Archives Canada
Books of Remembrance at Veterans Affairs Canada

World War I memorials in Canada
World War II memorials in Canada
Illuminated manuscripts
Canadian military memorials and cemeteries
Military history of Canada